CKGY-FM is a radio station located in Red Deer, Alberta. Owned by Stingray Group, it broadcasts a country format branded as Real Country 95.5.

CKGY switched to FM in 2001, after broadcasting on the AM frequency 1170 kHz where it had been heard since the early 1970s.

In November 2016, CKGY rebranded from KG Country to the Real Country brand, as with other Newcap-owned country stations in Alberta.

References

External links

 

Kgy
Kgy
Kgy
Radio stations established in 1973
1973 establishments in Alberta
Former Corus Entertainment subsidiaries